Gagliani is a surname. Notable people with the surname include:

 Matteo Gagliani (1655–1717), Roman Catholic prelate
 Oliver Gagliani (1917–2002), American photographer, and educator

See also
 Gagliano (disambiguation)
 Galliani, surname

Italian-language surnames